Temperance is an unincorporated community and census-designated place (CDP) in Monroe County in the U.S. state of Michigan. The population was 9,188 at the 2020 census.  The CDP is located within Bedford Township.

The community was established as early as 1859. The Temperance 48182 ZIP Code serves most of Bedford Township outside of the Lambertville area, as well as portions of western Erie Township, southern Ida Township, and northeast Whiteford Township.

History
Temperance was established as Bedford Center in 1859. On December 8, 1884, a post office was established at Bedford Center and was named Temperance with Lewis Ansted as the first postmaster. The name "Temperance" was suggested by the wife of one of the founding land owners, who was a member of the Woman's Christian Temperance Union. A petition was circulated and the name Bedford Center was changed to Temperance. During the early years of Temperance, the sale and consumption of alcoholic beverages was prohibited.

Geography

Climate

Demographics

As of the census of 2000, there were 7,757 people, 2,857 households, and 2,177 families residing in the CDP. The racial makeup of the CDP was 98.10% White, 0.19% African American, 0.14% Native American, 0.53% Asian, 0.01% Pacific Islander, 0.40% from other races, and 0.62% from two or more races. Hispanic or Latino of any race were 1.93% of the population.

There were 2,857 households, out of which 37.0% had children under the age of 18 living with them, 65.3% were married couples living together, 8.3% had a female householder with no husband present, and 23.8% were non-families. 20.2% of all households were made up of individuals, and 8.9% had someone living alone who was 65 years of age or older. The average household size was 2.68 and the average family size was 3.11.

In the CDP, the population was spread out, with 27.3% under the age of 18, 6.1% from 18 to 24, 29.2% from 25 to 44, 25.3% from 45 to 64, and 12.0% who were 65 years of age or older. The median age was 38 years. For every 100 females, there were 96.7 males. For every 100 females age 18 and over, there were 91.3 males.

The median income for a household in the CDP was $61,090, and the median income for a family was $70,230. Males had a median income of $51,182 versus $30,233 for females. The per capita income for the CDP was $24,237. About 2.3% of families and 3.6% of the population were below the poverty line, including 3.7% of those under age 18 and 2.9% of those age 65 or over.

Notable people 

 Harry Bidwell Ansted, pastor and educator
 Marty Huff, former NFL linebacker
 Bob Loga, stock car driver
 Norm Shinkle, former member of the Michigan Senate

Education
St. Anthony School of the Roman Catholic Archdiocese of Detroit was in Temperance. It opened in 1944.

References

Unincorporated communities in Monroe County, Michigan
Census-designated places in Michigan
Populated places established in 1859
Unincorporated communities in Michigan
Census-designated places in Monroe County, Michigan
1859 establishments in Michigan